Carl-Amery-Literaturpreis is a literary prize of Germany. It was founded by the Association of German Writers in Bavaria, the Luchterhand Literaturverlag and Verdi Bayern.

Literary awards of Bavaria